Neotelphusa melicentra is a moth of the family Gelechiidae first described by Edward Meyrick in 1921. It is found in Mozambique.

The wingspan is about 7 mm for males and 8 mm for females. The forewings are white speckled with dark grey and with a line of blackish-grey irroration (sprinkles) along the costa from the base to two-fifths, and a short similar mark beyond the middle. There are pale yellowish dots accompanied with a few blackish scales as follows, one towards the costa at one-fifth, one beneath the fold slightly beyond this, one nearer the costa at two-fifths, and three representing the stigmata, the first discal about the middle, the plical nearly beneath it and a small dorsal spot of black irroration beneath the second discal. There is some grey suffusion and scattered black irroration towards the apex. The hindwings are light grey.

References

Endemic fauna of Mozambique
Moths described in 1921
Neotelphusa